Joan Marter is an American academic, art critic and author. A 1968 graduate of Temple University, Marter is the "Distinguished Professor of Art History" at Rutgers University. Marter is the co-editor of the Woman's Art Journal, and the editor of The Grove Encyclopedia of American Art.

References

Living people
Temple University alumni
Rutgers University faculty
Year of birth missing (living people)